A Million for Love is a 1928 American silent crime drama film directed by Robert F. Hill and starring Reed Howes, Josephine Dunn and Lee Shumway.

Cast
 Reed Howes as Danny Eagan
 Josephine Dunn as Mary Norfleet
 Lee Shumway as D.A. Norfleet
 Mary Carr as Mrs. Eagan
 Lewis Sargent as Jimmy Eagan
 Jack Rich as Slim
 Frank Baker as Pete
 Alfred Fisher as Judge

References

Bibliography
 Munden, Kenneth White. The American Film Institute Catalog of Motion Pictures Produced in the United States, Part 1. University of California Press, 1997.

External links
 

1928 films
1928 drama films
1920s English-language films
American silent feature films
Silent American drama films
Films directed by Robert F. Hill
1920s American films